The Pontifical Bolivarian University, also referred to as UPB, is a private university in Colombia with its main campus in Medellín, where it was founded in 1936. As of June 2022, the UPB holds the top 4 university in Colombia and Top 30 in LATAM. Currently, the university has campuses in other Colombian cities, such as Bogotá, Bucaramanga, Montería and Palmira. As of January 2021, the university estimated its nationwide student population at 26,000 

The university offers 74 undergraduate programs, 68 master programs and 10 doctorate programs nationwide. The university groups its educational programs under the schools of Architecture And Urbanism, Design, Engineering, Health Sciences, Law and Political Sciences, Strategic Sciences (Management), Social Sciences, Education and Teaching, and Theology, Philosophy and Humanities. The university also operates elementary and high school programs under its educational umbrella.

The university has several distinguished alumni such as Former President of Colombia Belisario Betancur Cuartas, and Former First Lady of Colombia Lina María Moreno Mejía.

History 

The university was founded on September 15, 1936, by a decree of the Catholic Archbishop of Medellín, Monsignor Tiberio de Jesús Salazar y Herrera as the Universidad Católica Bolivariana (UCB, Catholic Bolivarian University). The UCB started with a small faculty and 78 students enrolled in the School of Law and with Monsignor Manuel José Sierra as its first rector. In 1945, the university received the title of Pontifical, from the Holy See under Pope Pius XII. With the right to use the title of Pontifical, the Pope became the Grand Chancellor of the university.

From the university's onset, Monsignor Manuel José Sierra wanted to anchor the university on the ideals of Christian humanism and those of the Libertador Simón Bolívar.

Academics 

The university has programs that extend from elementary and high school to undergraduate and postgraduate programs The UPB 74 undergraduate programs, 68 master programs and 10 doctorate programs nationwide :

Academic and geographical organization  

The university's organization is based on different types of academic units, namely:

 School: includes one or several faculties or academic programs in the same area of knowledge.
 Faculty: offers one or several curricula of professional formation.
 Program: academic plan that provides either basic, professional, complementary or higher education.
 Institute: academic unit that advances knowledge in an area through academic services, academic extension and/or research.
 Center: provides academic services within or outside the university.

The university is made up of 8 Schools (main campus), 19 centers, foundations and institutes  (Medellín) and in its satellite campuses, 13 centers, foundations and institutes. The university offers 42 undergraduate programs and 156 graduate programs: 11 doctoral programs, 48 master programs and 97 specializations.

Research 

As of 2021, the university had 315 docent researchers working within  91 research groups across Colombia.
which were coordinated by the Integrated Center for the Development of Research (CIDI from its initials in Spanish). The CIDI seeks to maintain a close and dynamic relationship between industry and academia through technology transfer and consulting services. The research groups are based in different campuses with the majority of them in Medellin. The research groups concentrate their efforts in the areas of Health Sciences, Social Sciences and Engineering.

Campuses

Main campus 

The main campus is located in Medellín and houses the main chapel, student health services, the main library and the schools of Engineering, Social Sciences, Architecture, and Languages as well as schools for primary and secondary education.

Bucaramanga 
The Bucaramanga campus opened on July 12, 1991, in the Archdiocesan Seminary. In 1998, UPB established its own home on the Piedecuesta Highway, 7 kilometers away from the city. The estimated UPB Bucaramanga student population in 2013 was 5,800 students.

The UPB Bucaramanga campus houses the following schools:

Strategic Sciences' School 
Business administration
International business management

Social Sciences' School 
Social communication and journalism
Psychology

Law and Political Science's School 
Law

Engineering's School 
Electronic engineering
Computer engineering
Industrial engineering
Mechanical engineering
Civil engineering
Environmental engineering

Montería 

The university opened its campus in Montería on May 25, 1995. The campus established the university's presence in Colombia's Atlantic region with academic programs in law, management, journalism, engineering, informatics, electronics, mechanical, agroindustrial, environmental management and several graduate programs. The campus is estimated to have 2,028 students.

Palmira 
The university established its presence in the coffee region of the country through its Palmira campus. The university opened the campus in 2001 with programs such as Psychology, Marketing, Human Resources, Management, and Economics. The university currently has 218 students and it is the newest campus of the university in Colombia.

Affiliations 
UPB is member of different international associations and programs. It is also a chair of UNESCO on Human Development and a member of the Foundation for Studies in France. It belongs also to the Sígueme Program a group that gathered 10 Colombian universities. UPB has agreements with universities in Germany, Argentina, Brazil, Canada, Chile, Spain, France, United Kingdom, Netherlands, Mexico, Peru, Uruguay, United States, Colombia, Cuba and Venezuela.

Libraries 
UPB has a complete system of documentation and bibliography, with the central library residing in a dedicated four-story building. Every school at UPB has its own library interconnected with the Central one.

Gallery

See also 
 List of universities in Colombia
 Pontifical university

References

 Así nos habló: Visita Apostólica de S.S. Juan Pablo II a Colombia, Julio 1 a 7 de 1986, Comité Ejecutivo Nacional, Secretariado Permanente del Episcopado Colombiano, Bogotá, 1986. (He spoke to us like this: Apostolic Visit of Pope John Paul II to Colombia)

External links

 
 Universidad Pontificia Bolivariana - Guía de Carreras Universitarias (Spanish)
 Universidad Pontificia Bolivariana en Guía de Universidades (Spanish)

 
Educational institutions established in 1936
Bolivariana
Universities and colleges in Colombia
Catholic universities and colleges in Colombia
Universities and colleges in Medellín
1936 establishments in Colombia